Russ music is a subgenre of electronic dance music and a music scene which originated from Norway during the mid-2000s. Drawing inspiration from EDM, hip hop and techno. Russ music is characterized by its fast tempo, synthesizers, notable bass and explicit lyrics, often combined with rapping.

Usually, this type of music are produced on request by Norwegian high school graduates to promote their "russ concept" as a part of the russ celebration.

Russ music has lately been labeled as a controversial genre as a part of an constantly growing market. Record producers are heavily criticized for their use of explicit lyrics, as the distribution of russ music has grown to be an independent music industry in Norway.

Some notable artists
Russ music producers
Tix / The Pøssy Project
Soppgirobygget
Unge Lama
Dj Smellhodet
DJ Loppetiss
BEK & Wallin
BEK & Moberg
Kudos
Truse Tarzan
Smörebua
Fjelltopp
RAGGARSVINET
Spasme
Mackarinø
El Papi
Olav Haust
Solguden & Mannen
Sandmans
Ringnes-Ronny
Kuselofte
Öresus
Heux
B3nte
LIL FAT
Kobojsarna
Recurring producers
Skrillex 
ItaloBrothers
Technikore
Former producers
Mikkel Christiansen / Simen A
Kygo
DJ Walkzz
Ketz
K-391
Tungevaag / Tungevaag & Raaban
Stian K
Russetunes
Lensko

See also
Russefeiring

References

External links
Library of Russ artists on Everynoise
Articles
Russemusikk har blitt et springbrett til internasjonal musikkarriere
Russemusikk: Et springbrett til en internasjonal musikkarriere
Tjener fett på russebusslåter
Russelåtkonge tjener opptil en halv million på én sang
- Å lage russelåter var egentlig ikke min intensjon

Electronic dance music genres
Norwegian styles of music
2000s in music